UFO Kidnapped is a 1983 Nickelodeon production created by Roger Price and Geoffrey Darby. It was originally going to be a series and although the pilot aired on Nickelodeon, the series was not picked up. It used many of the cast members from You Can't Do That on Television including its main character Les Lye, and was filmed in Toronto, Ontario.

Synopsis
The episode starts when Lye (Sam Smythe) is in a house where he was doing a burglary, and the lights start flashing on and off. When he suspects something is very wrong, he runs outside in a state of panic. While running he falls on the ground, as he looks up a UFO is hovering over him! Then a giant green ball comes and takes him inside of the UFO. After that when two teenage boys, Alasdair and Kevin were out in their woods after being dropped of by their father with their dog Amber, and planning on how they were going to spend their camping trip. When they heard their dog barking Kevin asks "What is it, Amber?", and Alasdair's flashlight starts going on and off. Kevin then asks Alasdair to stop doing that, but Alasdair claims he is not doing so. Then they both see a UFO come out and just like Smythe, they both run.

When they hide, Amber runs out and as Alasdair screams in horror, the same giant green ball that took Smythe then also takes Amber. As this happens Alasdair screams out for the UFO not to take Amber, and then both watch the UFO fly away. While trying to figure out what to do they hear a cop calling them, relieved they run the greet him, and then get into his vehicle. But then they notice that they had seen this cop earlier in morning, and realize he couldn't be this far out where they were. When they find out that the cop car is really a trap, the car becomes the same green ball that took Smythe and Amber, and then takes them in to the UFO.

Once aboard the UFO they both wake up in a place that looks identical to their bedroom, but when they find they can't get out, and after Kevin strikes it with a baseball bat, they realize they are not at home. The image of the bedroom them disappears, and becomes the inside of the UFO. While not be able to move they are greeted by the loolis, who welcome, comfort, and hug them. The then are told that the loolis themselves were also abducted, that and their dog is okay, both them then can move, and then Klea Scott and Amber come out to greet them. When he is told that he is in a UFO he thinks Klea is crazy.

When they meet the Shandrillas they are told that they were wanted as pets, and to enjoy their stay. Also the Shandrillas discuss Black Holes, with Alasdair and that they can enter them. While this is taking place when Klea gives food to Smythe, Sythme holds Klea from the cell, unlocks and escapes, while holding Klea hostage. Smythe and his hostage Klea the go further into the ship where everyone else is. Sythme then realizes he really is in a UFO, and then faints. The Shandrilla then says they will be entering a Black Hole, and when they come out he tells Alasdair that they are many light years away. They then land on a desert planet. Just like before Alasdair then wakes up aboard the UFO that looks his room thinking it was all a dream, but this time Kevin is not with him. Again the room was locked, but Alasdair imagines his way out, then meets Klea and asks "Where's Kevin?" Then Kevin, Smythe, and Amber are beamed out of the UFO, held hostage by the Shandrilla's and sold as slaves. The loolis then go and rescue Smythe and Kevin, who also free another prisoner who was there as well, and they all are beamed back aboard the UFO. The Guards who they fought on the way back to their UFO follow out them into space. Alasdair then comes up with the idea to fly through a Black Hole to escape them, and when he does he does he losses sight of the following ship. They then see earth and rejoice, but as Alasdair and Smythe question whether if it is their earth, they then realize they might be in a parallel universe.

Cast and characters

References

External links

1980s Canadian children's television series
1980s Canadian science fiction television series
1983 Canadian television series debuts
1983 Canadian television series endings
Articles containing video clips
Canadian children's adventure television series
Canadian children's science fiction television series
Television pilots not picked up as a series
UFO-related television